James William Holt (May 27, 1944 – March 29, 2019) was an American professional baseball outfielder and first baseman.

Career
He graduated from Graham High School (North Carolina), also known as Graham Colored High School, and was drafted by the Kansas City Athletics in 1965. He was also drafted by the U.S. and his subsequent service in Vietnam delayed the start of his professional baseball career. He made his major league debut on April 17, 1968 and played his last game on October 3, 1976.

On the Arizona Instructional League team in 1967, Holt batted a team-best .367 on the Athletics' affiliated squad that also included Vida Blue, Bert Campaneris, Rollie Fingers, and Reggie Jackson. Holt was an outfielder and first baseman with the Minnesota Twins from 1968–74 and Oakland Athletics from 1974–76. As a member of the 1974 World Series champion Athletics, he had a pinch-hit single in game two, which the Athletics lost to the Dodgers. He drove in 2 runs with a pinch-hit single in game four, which the A's won. He had a career batting average of .265 with 19 home runs and 177 runs batted in in 707 games. He was good defensively, recording a career .993 fielding percentage playing at all three outfield positions and first base. In 3621.1 innings in the field, Holt committed only 12 errors. He played in 4 World Series games and 8 American League Championship Series games.

After his major league career ended, he played with the Chihuahua Dorados in 1977 and the Monterrey Sultanes in 1978, both in the Mexican League Northeast.

He died on March 29, 2019, at 2:08pm in the small Osceola Community, North Carolina; which is, located just north of the city of Burlington, in Alamance County.

References

External links
, or Retrosheet, or SABR Biography Project, or Pura Pelota

1944 births
2019 deaths
African-American baseball players
American expatriate baseball players in Mexico
Arizona Instructional League Athletics players
Baseball players from North Carolina
Denver Bears players
Dorados de Chihuahua players
Florida Instructional League Twins players
Major League Baseball first basemen
Major League Baseball outfielders
Minnesota Twins players
Navegantes del Magallanes players
American expatriate baseball players in Venezuela
Oakland Athletics players
Peninsula Grays players
People from Graham, North Carolina
Sultanes de Monterrey players
Tacoma Twins players
Tigres de Aragua players
Tucson Toros players
20th-century African-American sportspeople
21st-century African-American people